The Petaluma River is a river in the California counties of Sonoma and Marin that becomes a tidal slough for most of its length. The headwaters are in the area southwest of Cotati. The flow is generally southward through Petaluma's old town, where the waterway becomes navigable, and then flows another  through tidal marshes before emptying into the northwest corner of San Pablo Bay.

History
The word Petaluma may derive from the Miwok words pe’ta, flat, and luma, back. The Miwok people lived in Sonoma County for more than 2500 years. Petaluma was the name of a village on a low hill east of Petaluma creek and north east of the present day town of Petaluma.
The first recorded exploration of the Petaluma River was by Captain Fernando Quiros in October, 1776. While other members of his Spanish expedition collected adobe and timber for the new Presidio of San Francisco and for the Mission San Francisco de Asís (Mission Dolores), Quiros and his sailors tried unsuccessfully to sail from San Pablo Bay to Bodega Bay.

Petaluma River Watershed
Located in southern Sonoma County, California, and a portion of northeastern Marin, the Petaluma River Watershed drains . At , Sonoma Mountain is the highest point in the watershed, and its western slopes drain to the Petaluma River by way of tributaries such as Lichau Creek, Lynch Creek, Washington Creek, and Adobe Creek. The lower  of the Petaluma River flow through the Petaluma Marsh, the largest remaining salt marsh in San Pablo Bay. In the marshes west of Lakeville, the river is joined by San Antonio Creek, at which point it becomes the boundary between Marin County and Sonoma County. The river flows under State Route 37 at Green Point and enters northwest San Pablo Bay just north of Petaluma Point.

The river is fully tidal  from its mouth, indicating its slight gradient through the marshes below Petaluma. The United States Army Corps of Engineers dredges this section to keep it navigable by gravel barges and pleasure craft.

Ecology

The Petaluma River Watershed hosts several federally endangered animals including the salt marsh harvest mouse (Reithrodontomys raviventris), the North American River Otter (Lontra canadensis), and Ridgway's Rail (Rallus obsoletus). Endangered flora include soft bird’s-beak (Cordylanthus mollis ssp. mollis), Baker’s stickyseed (Blennosperma bakeri), Burke’s goldfields (Lasthenia burkei), showy Indian clover (Trifolium amoenum),  and  Sebastopol meadowfoam (Limnanthes vinculans).

Steelhead (Oncorhyncus mykiss) that spawn and rear in the Petaluma River watershed are wild, not hatchery, stock. Chinook salmon (Oncorhynchus tshawytscha) are seen in the main stem of the Petaluma River and The United Anglers of Casa Grande High School have seen chinook at the turning basin, near the Lynch Creek confluence. The high school students constructed a salmonid hatchery in 1993 and in 2002 74 Chinook salmon returned to spawn in the Adobe Creek tributary.

Habitat and pollution
The marshes provide an important wildlife habitat and fish hatchery. However, since the onset of intensive immigration in the mid-1850s, the water quality has diminished, partly due to overgrazing and other agricultural uses. Pollutants present in the river include nitrates, phosphates, petroleum hydrocarbons, pesticides and sediment. Urban runoff, particularly from the City of Petaluma, adds heavy metals and hydrocarbons to the river. Starting about 1990, material steps were taken to mitigate the pollution.

Because the Petaluma River is relatively well-protected, most of the pollution comes from nearby storm drains. It is up to the people of Petaluma to keep the river clean.

Because most of the length of the waterway is tidal and urban/suburban, there is a significant collection of tidally deposited debris along the banks. Despite the poor aesthetics including turbidity, the water quality is not particularly poor.

It has been alleged that the greatest threat to the Petaluma River is the planned Dutra asphalt plant. The reported concerns involve the "loud noises it will create" that will scare away the birds and "throw off the entire ecosystem".

Bridges
The following bridges span the Petaluma River moving upstream from San Pablo Bay through Petaluma: the Black Point Railroad Bridge (NWP), California State Route 37, Haystack Landing Bridge (NWP), U.S. 101, D Street, Washington Street, Lakeville Street, NWP, Payran Street, NWP, Oak Drive, Corona Road, Petaluma Boulevard North, and Rainsville Road. The oldest public bridge, built in 1925, is a  concrete triple span carrying two lanes of Petaluma Boulevard North.

The Petaluma Blvd South Interchange project will construct a new interchange at Petaluma Blvd South, frontage roads and replace the Petaluma River bridge. The existing Petaluma River bridge is an 866 feet long, twin reinforced concrete box girder (with pre-cast I girder span over the river) bridge that was built in 1955. The existing bridge has two lanes of traffic in each direction and no shoulders The new bridge will be 907 feet long with three lanes of traffic in each direction and standard shoulders. This will be one of the longest precast, post-tensioned spliced concrete girder bridges in the U.S. Constructing the new bridge over the Petaluma River, which is a navigation channel, will be very challenging. The bridge will be constructed in three stages and require erection of 99 girders up to 130 feet in length and weighing up to 60 tons each.

The project will also replace the existing South Petaluma Blvd On/Off Ramps constructed underneath Highway 101 in the mid 1950s with a new "diamond" interchange with a decorative gateway structure (overcrossing).

Construction is anticipated to be complete by the end of 2016.

See also
Endangered species
List of rivers in California
List of watercourses in the San Francisco Bay Area
Wetland

References

External links
 Petaluma Wetlands Alliance
 real-time measurements
 LIVE Blue Heron Nesting Camera Petaluma River, Petaluma, CA
 PRBO Conservation Science (based in Petaluma)

 
Estuaries of California
Rivers of Marin County, California
Rivers of Sonoma County, California
Wetlands of the San Francisco Bay Area
Rivers of Northern California
Tributaries of San Pablo Bay
Landforms of Sonoma County, California